Briceag is a Romanian and Moldovan surname. Notable people with the surname include:
Gheorghe Briceag (1928–2008), Moldovan human rights activist
Marius Briceag (born 1992), Romanian footballer

Romanian-language surnames
Surnames of Moldovan origin